The year 1948 in science and technology involved some significant events, listed below.

Astronomy and space science
 February 16 – Miranda, innermost of the large moons of Uranus, is discovered by Gerard Kuiper from the McDonald Observatory in Texas.
 October 10 – An R-1 (missile) on test becomes the first Soviet launch to enter space.

Biology
 August 7 – Teaching and research in Mendelian genetics is prohibited in the Soviet Union in favour of Lysenkoist theories of the inheritance of acquired characteristics.
 October 5 – Delegates to a conference organised by Sir Julian Huxley at Fontainebleau agree to formation of the International Union for Conservation of Nature.
 November 20 – The South Island takahē, a flightless bird generally thought to have been extinct for fifty years, is rediscovered by Geoffrey Orbell near Lake Te Anau in the South Island of New Zealand.
 Last recorded sighting of the Caspian tiger in Kazakhstan.
 Publication of Fairfield Osborne's Our Plundered Planet, a Malthusian critique of human environmental destruction.

Computer science
 May 12 – World's first stored-program computer operates, the mechanical ARC (Automatic Relay Calculator) at Birkbeck College, University of London (largely built by Kathleen Booth).
 June 21 – World's first working program run on an electronic stored-program computer, the Manchester Baby (written by Tom Kilburn).
 July–October – Claude E. Shannon publishes "A Mathematical Theory of Communication" in Bell System Technical Journal, regarded as a foundation of information theory, introducing the concept of Shannon entropy and adopting the term Bit.

History of science
 December 17 – The original Wright Flyer goes on display in the Smithsonian Institution.

Medicine and human sciences
 January 5 – The first Kinsey Report, Sexual Behavior in the Human Male, is published in the United States.
 April 7 –  The World Health Organization is established by the United Nations.
 July 5 – The National Health Service begins functioning in the United Kingdom, giving the right to universal healthcare, free at point of use.
 Winter 1948/49 – Outbreak of Akureyri disease in Iceland.
 In psychology, Bertram Forer demonstrates the Barnum effect (that people tend to accept generalised descriptions of personality as uniquely applicable to themselves).
 Julius Axelrod and Bernard Brodie identify the analgesic properties of acetaminophen.

Meteorology
 March 25 – Meteorologists at Tinker Air Force Base in Oklahoma City issue the world's first tornado forecast, for the second of the 1948 Tinker Air Force Base tornadoes.

Physics
 April 1 – Physicists Ralph Asher Alpher and George Gamow publish the Alpher–Bethe–Gamow paper about the Big Bang.
 May 29 – Casimir effect predicted by Dutch physicist Hendrik Casimir.
 Herbert Fröhlich makes a key breakthrough in understanding superconductivity, at the University of Liverpool.

Technology
 June 18 – Columbia Records unveil the LP records developed by Peter Goldmark of CBS Laboratories.
 First modern long-span permanent box girder bridge completed, between Cologne and Deutz.

Publications
 First publication of Norbert Wiener's Cybernetics: Or Control and Communication in the Animal and the Machine.
 Publication in Britain of the novel No Highway by former aeronautical engineer Nevil Shute, dealing with the effects of metal fatigue on aircraft.

Awards
 Nobel Prizes
 Physics – Patrick Maynard Stuart Blackett
 Chemistry – Arne Wilhelm Kaurin Tiselius
 Medicine – Paul Hermann Müller

Births
 January 30 – Akira Yoshino, Japanese chemist, recipient of the Nobel Prize in Chemistry.
 March 1 – Alison Richard, English primatologist and academic.
 March 9 – László Lovász, Hungarian computer scientist.
 March 21 – Robert Watson, British atmospheric chemist.
 June 13 – Nina L. Etkin (died 2009), American anthropologist and biologist.
 June 28 – Kenneth Alan Ribet, American mathematician.
 July 20 – Martin Green, Australian solar cell researcher.
 August 4 – Giorgio Parisi, Italian, theoretical physicist, recipient of the Nobel Prize in Physics.
 August 7 – James P. Allison, American immunologist, recipient of the Nobel Prize in Physiology or Medicine.
 August 25 – Nicholas A. Peppas, Greek chemical and biomedical engineer.
 August 29 – Robert S. Langer, American biomedical engineer.
 August 30 – Victor Skumin, Russian scientist, psychiatrist and psychologist; describes Skumin syndrome in 1978.
 September 2 – Christa McAuliffe, born Sharon Christa Corrigan (died 1986), American astronaut.
 October 29 – Frans de Waal, Dutch primatologist.
 October 31 – Mu-ming Poo, Chinese neuroscientist.
 December 30 – Randy Schekman, American cell biologist, recipient of the Nobel Prize in Physiology or Medicine.
 Margaret Allen, American cardiothoracic surgeon.
 Robert Plomin, American-born psychologist.

Deaths
 January 30 – Orville Wright (born 1871), American pioneer aviator.
 May 26 – Sir George Newman (born 1870), English public health physician.
 June 10 – Philippa Fawcett (born 1868), English mathematician.
 June 21 – D'Arcy Wentworth Thompson (born 1860), Scottish biologist.
 December 12 – Marjory Stephenson (born 1885), English biochemist.

References

 
20th century in science
1940s in science